The Wales national Under 18 rugby team is for Welsh rugby union players aged 18 or under on January 1 of the year during which they are selected.

They compete in the Under 18 Six Nations Festival and a separate under 18's four nation tournament.

Current squad

Wales Under 18's squad for the 2019 season

Forwards: 
 S’Connor (Llandovery)
 Oliver Burrows (Ospreys, Millfield School)
 Lewys Jones (Ospreys, Ysgol Gyfun Ystalyfera)
 James Fenders (Ospreys, Neath/Port Talbor College)
 Ben Carter (Dragons, Caldicot – Capt)
 Alex Mann (Cardiff Blues, Coleg y Cymoedd) 
 Harri Deaves (Ospreys, Coleg y Cymoedd) 
 Carwyn Tuipulotu (Scarlets, Sedburgh)
 Rhodri King (Scarlets, Coleg Sir Gar)
 Kieron Stevens (Ospreys, Bridgend College) 
 Iestyn Haskins (Cardiff Blues, Coleg y Cymoedd)
 Harry Breeze (Scarlets, Whitgift School)

Backs: 
 Dan John (Exiles, Hartpury College) 
 Mason Grady (Cardiff Blues, Glantaf/Bro Morgannwg)
 Ioan Evans (Cardiff Blues, Coleg y Cymoedd)
 Tom Matthews (Exiles, Hartpury College)
 Louis Rees-Zammit (Gloucester, Hartpury College)
 Ioan Lloyd (Bristol, Clifton College)
 Dylan Davies (Dragons, Newbridge/Cross Keys College);

References

Rugby union
European national under-18 rugby union teams